Cinema of Africa is both the history and present of the making or screening of films on the African continent, and also refers to the persons involved in this form of audiovisual culture. It dates back to the early 20th century, when film reels were the primary cinematic technology in use. During the colonial era, African life was shown only by the work of white, colonial, Western filmmakers, who depicted Africans in a negative fashion, as exotic "others". As there are more than 50 countries with audiovisual traditions, there is no one single 'African cinema'. Both historically and culturally, there are major regional differences between North African and sub-Saharan cinemas, and between the cinemas of different countries.

The cinema of Tunisia and the cinema of Egypt are among the oldest in the world. Pioneers Auguste and Louis Lumière screened their films in Alexandria, Cairo, Tunis, Soussa and Hammam-Lif in 1896. Albert Samama Chikly is often cited as the first producer of indigenous African cinema, screening his own short documentaries in the casino of Tunis as early as December 1905. Alongside his daughter Haydée Tamzali, Chikly would go on to produce important early milestones such as 1924's The Girl from Carthage. In 1935 the MISR film studio in Cairo began producing mostly formulaic comedies and musicals, but also films like Kamal Selim's The Will (1939). Egyptian cinema flourished in the 1940s, 1950s and 1960s, considered its Golden Age. Youssef Chahine's seminal Cairo Station (1958) laid a foundation for Arab film.

The Nigerian film industry is the largest in Africa in terms of volume, number of annual films, revenue and popularity. It is also the second largest film producer in the world. In 2016 Nigeria's film industry contributed 2.3% towards its gross domestic product (GDP).

History

Colonial era

During the colonial era, Africa was represented largely by Western filmmakers. In the first decades of the twentieth century, Western filmmakers made films that depicted black Africans as "exoticized", "submissive workers" or as "savage or cannibalistic". For example, see Kings of the Cannibal Islands in 1909, Voodoo Vengeance (1913) and Congorilla (1932). Colonial era films portrayed Africa as exotic, without history or culture. Examples abound and include jungle epics based on the Tarzan character created by Edgar Rice Burroughs and the adventure film The African Queen (1951), and various adaptations of H. Rider Haggard's novel King Solomon's Mines (1885). Much early ethnographic cinema "focused on highlighting the differences between indigenous people and the white civilised man, thus reinforcing colonial propaganda". Marc Allégret's first film,Voyage au Congo (1927) respectfully portrayed the Masa people, in particular a young African entertaining his little brother with a baby crocodile on a string. Yet Africans were portrayed merely as human, but not equals; a dialogue card for example referred to the movements of a traditional dance as naive. His lover, writer André Gide, accompanied Allégret and wrote a book, also titled Voyage au Congo. Allégret later made Zouzou, starring Josephine Baker, the first major film starring a black woman. Baker had caused a sensation in the Paris arts scene by dancing in the  clad only in a string of bananas.

In the French colonies, Africans were prohibited by the 1934 Laval Decree from making films of their own. The ban stunted the growth of film as a means of African expression, political, cultural, and artistic. Congolese Albert Mongita did make The Cinema Lesson in 1951 and in 1953 Mamadou Touré made Mouramani based on a folk story about a man and his dog. In 1955, Paulin Soumanou Vieyra originally from Benin, but educated in Senegal along with his colleagues from Le Group Africain du Cinema, shot a short film in Paris, Afrique-sur-Seine (1955). Vieyra was trained in filmmaking at the Institut des hautes études cinématographiques (IDHEC) in Paris, and despite the ban on filmmaking in Africa, was granted permission to make a film in France. Considered the first film directed by a black African, Afrique Sur Seine explores the difficulties of being an African in 1950s France.

Portuguese colonies came to independence with no film production facilities at all, since the colonial government there restricted film-making to colonialist propaganda, emphasizing the inferiority of indigenous populations. Therefore, little thought was given until independence to developing authentic African voices.

In the mid-1930s, the Bantu Educational Kinema Experiment in eastern and south-eastern African countries was conducted in an attempt to "educate the Bantu, mostly about hygiene. Only three films from this project survive; they are kept at the British Film Institute.

Before the colonies' independence, few anti-colonial films were produced. Examples include Statues Also Die (Les statues meurent aussi) by Chris Marker and Alain Resnais, about European theft of African art. The second part of this film was for 10 years banned in France. Afrique 50 by René Vautier, showed anti-colonial riots in Côte d'Ivoire and in Upper Volta (now Burkina Faso).

Also doing film work in Africa at this time was French ethnographic filmmaker Jean Rouch, controversial with both French and African audiences. Film documentaries such as Jaguar (1955), Les maitres fous (1955), Moi, un noir (1958) and La pyramide humaine (1961). Rouch's documentaries were not explicitly anti-colonial, but did challenge perceptions of colonial Africa and give a new voice to Africans. Although Rouch was accused by Ousmane Sembene and others of seeing Africans "as if they are insects," Rouch was an important figure in the developing field of African film and was the first person to work with Africans, of whom many had important careers in African cinema (Oumarou Ganda, Safi Faye and Moustapha Alassane, and others).

Because most films made prior to independence were egregiously racist in nature, African filmmakers of the independence era such as Ousmane Sembene and Oumarou Ganda, among others saw filmmaking as an important political tool for rectifying the image of Africans put forward by Western filmmakers and for reclaiming the image of Africa for Africans.

Post-independence and 1970s

The first African film to win international recognition was Sembène Ousmane's La Noire de... also known as Black Girl. It showed the despair of an African woman who has to work as a maid in France. It won the Prix Jean Vigo in 1966. Initially a writer, Sembène had turned to cinema to reach a wider audience. He is still considered the "father of African cinema". Sembène's native Senegal continued to be the most important place of African film production for more than a decade.

With the creation of the African film festival FESPACO in today's Burkina Faso in 1969, African film created its own forum. FESPACO now takes place every two years in alternation with the Carthago film festival in Tunisia.

The Pan African Federation of Filmmakers (Fédération Panafricaine des Cinéastes, or FEPACI) was formed in 1969 to promote African film industries in terms of production, distribution and exhibition. From its inception, FEPACI was seen as a critical partner organization to the Organisation of African Unity (OAU), now the African Union. FEPACI looks at the role of film in the politico-economic and cultural development of African states and the continent as a whole.

Med Hondo's Soleil O, shot in 1969, was immediately recognized. No less politically engaged than Sembène, he chose a more controversial filmic language to show what it means to be a stranger in France with the "wrong" skin colour.

1980s and 1990s
Souleymane Cissé's Yeelen (Mali, 1987) was the first film made by a Black African to compete at Cannes. Cheick Oumar Sissoko's Guimba (Mali, 1995) was also well received in the West. Many films of the 1990s, including Quartier Mozart by Jean-Pierre Bekolo (Cameroon, 1992), are situated in the globalized African metropolis.

Nigerian cinema experienced a large growth in the 1990s with the increasing availability of home video cameras in Nigeria, and soon put Nollywood in the nexus for West African English-language films. Nollywood produced 1844 movies in 2013 alone.

The last movie theatre in Kinshasa, Democratic Republic of the Congo, shut down in 2004. Many of the former cinemas were converted to churches. In 2009 the UN refugee agency screened Breaking the Silence  in South Kivu and Katanga Province. The film deals with rape in the Congolese civil wars. In neighboring Brazzaville, Republic of the Congo, a 200-seat cinema, MTS Movies House, opened in 2016, and in April 2018, construction began on another new cinema .

A first African Film Summit took place in South Africa in 2006. It was followed by FEPACI 9th Congress. The African Movie Academy Awards were launched in 2004, marking the growth of local film industries like that of Nigeria as well as the development and spread of the film industry culture in sub-Saharan Africa.

2000s and 2010s 
Contemporary African cinema deals with a wide variety of themes relating to modern issues and universal problems.

Migration and relations between African and European countries is a common theme among many African films. Abderrahmane Sissako's film Waiting for Happiness portrays a Mauritanian city struggling against foreign influences through the journey of a migrant coming home from Europe. Migration is also an important theme in Mahamat Saleh Haroun's film Une Saison en France, which shows the journey of a family from the Central African Republic seeking asylum in France. Haroun is part of the Chadian diaspora in France, and uses the film to explore aspects of this diasporan experience.

Africanfuturism and Afrofuturism is a growing genre, encompassing Africans both on the continent and in the diaspora who tell science or speculative fiction stories involving Africa and African people. Neill Blomkamp's District 9 is a well-known example, portraying an alien invasion of South Africa. Wanuri Kahiu's short film Pumzi portrays the futuristic fictional Maitu community in Africa 35 years after World War III.

Directors including Haroun and Kahiu have expressed concerns about the lack of cinema infrastructure and appreciation in various African countries. However, organizations such as the Changamoto arts fund are providing more resources and opportunities to African filmmakers.

2020s 

Some African countries suffer a lack of freedom of speech, that undermine the film industry. This is specially severe in Equatorial Guinea. The feature film The Writer From a Country Without Bookstores is the first to be shot in the country and critic with Teodoro Obiang Nguema Mbasogo's dictatorship, one of the longest lasting in the world.

Themes

African cinema, like cinema in other world regions, covers a wide variety of topics. In Algiers in 1975, the Pan African Federation of Filmmakers (FEPACI) adopted the Charte du cinéaste africain (Charter of the African cinéaste), which recognized the importance of postcolonial and neocolonial realities in African cinema. The filmmakers start by recalling the neocolonial condition of African societies. "The situation contemporary African societies live in is one in which they are dominated on several levels: politically, economically and culturally." African filmmakers stressed their solidarity with progressive filmmakers in other parts of the world. African cinema is often seen a part of Third Cinema.

Some African filmmakers, for example Ousmane Sembène, try to give African history back to African people by remembering the resistance to European and Islamic domination.

The African filmmaker is often compared to the traditional griot. Like griots, filmmakers' task is to express and reflect communal experiences. Patterns of African oral literature often recur in African films. African film has also been influenced by traditions from other continents, such as Italian neorealism, Brazilian Cinema Novo and the theatre of Bertolt Brecht.

In Mauritania CINEPARC RIBAT AL BAHR is an open air drive-in cinema located in Nouakchott, the only one of its kind in Africa. In addition to the projection schedule, the drive-in have a new application iOS and Android provides you with the biggest international movie database in which you can find information such as plot summaries, cast members, production crews, critics reviews, ratings, fan trivia, and much more about movies, series, and all cinematic work.

UNESCO report on the African film industry 
In October 2021, UNESCO published a report of the film and audiovisual industry in 54 states of the African continent, including quantitative and qualitative data and an analysis of their strengths and weaknesses at the continental and regional levels. The report proposes strategic recommendations for the development of the film and audiovisual sectors in Africa and invites policymakers, professional organizations, firms, filmmakers and artists to implement them in a concerted manner.

Part 1 of the report is titled Pan-African Trends shaping the Future of the Continent's Film and Audiovisual Sector, part 2 Strategic Development and Growth Models, part 3 presents detailed national mappings of the countries, and an annex lists historical key dates in African cinema from 1896 to 2021. Apart from the historical developments of audiovisual productions, major filmmakers and their artistic merit and recent trends, such as online streaming, as well as the lack of training, funding and appreciation of this industry are discussed.

List of cinema by region

North Africa
 Cinema of Algeria
 Cinema of Egypt
 Cinema of Libya
 Cinema of Morocco
 Cinema of Tunisia

West Africa
 Cinema of Benin
 Cinema of Burkina Faso
 Cinema of Cape Verde
 Cinema of the Gambia
 Cinema of Ghana
 Cinema of Guinea
 Cinema of Guinea-Bissau
 Cinema of Ivory Coast
 Cinema of Liberia
 Cinema of Mali
 Cinema of Mauritania
 Cinema of Niger
 Cinema of Nigeria
 Cinema of Senegal
 Cinema of Sierra Leone
 Cinema of Togo

Central Africa
 Cinema of Angola
 Cinema of Burundi
 Cinema of Cameroon
 Cinema of the Central African Republic
 Cinema of Chad
 Cinema of the Democratic Republic of the Congo
 Cinema of Equatorial Guinea
 Cinema of Gabon
 Cinema of the Republic of the Congo
 Cinema of Rwanda
 Cinema of São Tomé and Príncipe

East Africa
 Cinema of the Comoros
 Cinema of Djibouti
 Cinema of Eritrea
 Cinema of Ethiopia
 Cinema of Kenya
 Cinema of Mauritius
 Cinema of Seychelles
 Cinema of Somalia
 Cinema of South Sudan
 Cinema of Sudan
 Cinema of Tanzania
 Cinema of Uganda

Southern Africa
 Cinema of Botswana
 Cinema of Eswatini
 Cinema of Lesotho
 Cinema of Madagascar
 Cinema of Malawi
 Cinema of Namibia
 Cinema of South Africa
 Cinema of Zambia
 Cinema of Zimbabwe

Women directors
Recognised as one of the pioneers of Senegalese cinema as well as cinema developed on the African continent at large, ethnologist and filmmaker Safi Faye was the first African woman film director to gain international recognition. Faye's first film La Passante (The Passerby) was released in 1972 and following this, Kaddu Beykat (Letter from My Village), the filmmaker's first feature film was released in 1975. Faye continued to be active with several released works in the latter half of the 1970s all the way through her latest work, the 1996 drama film Mossane.

Sarah Maldoror, a French filmmaker and the daughter of immigrants from Guadeloupe has been recognised as one of the pioneers of African cinema in the diaspora. She is the founder of Les Griots (The Troubadours), the first drama company in France made for actors of African and Afro-Caribbean descent. Originally in the theatre, she went on to study filmmaking at the State Institute of Cinematography of the Russian Federation (VGIK) in Moscow. In 1972, Maldoror shot her film Sambizanga about the 1961–74 war in Angola. Surviving African women of this war are the subject of the documentary Les Oubliées (The forgotten women), made by Anne-Laure Folly 20 years later. Maldoror also worked as assistant director on The Battle of Algiers (1966) with filmmaker Gillo Pontecorvo.

In 1995, Wanjiru Kinyanjui made the feature film The Battle of the Sacred Tree in Kenya.

In 2008, Manouchka Kelly Labouba became the first woman in the history of Gabonese cinema to direct a fictional film. Her short film Le Divorce addresses the impact of modern and traditional values on the divorce of a young Gabonese couple.

Kemi Adetiba, hitherto a music video director, made her directorial debut in 2016 with The Wedding Party. The film, about the events involved in the celebration of an aristocratic wedding, would go on to become the most successful Nollywood film in the history of her native Nigeria.

Wanuri Kahiu is a Kenyan film director, best known for her film From a Whisper, which was awarded Best Director, Best Screenplay, and Best Picture at the Africa Movie Academy Awards in 2009. Nearly 10 years after the release of From a Whisper, Kahiu's film Rafiki, a coming-of-age romantic drama about two teenage girls in the present-day Kenya. The film made headlines, partly for its selection at the Cannes Film Festival but also for its exploration of sexuality that did not sit well with the Kenyan government.

Rungano Nyoni, best known for the internationally acclaimed feature film I am Not a Witch is a Zambian-Welsh director and screenwriter. Born in Zambia and also raised in Wales, Nyoni went on to graduate from the University of Arts in London with a Master's in acting in 2009. Her filmography as a filmmaker (whether as a director or/and screenwriter) also include the short films: The List (2009, short), Mwansa The Great (2011, short), Listen (2014, short) and she was also one of the directors of the international film project Nordic Factory (2014). She has been awarded with a variety of awards including a BAFTA for outstanding debut by a British filmmaker for I am Not a Witch.

In 2019, Azza Cheikh Malainine became the first woman in the history of Mauritania's cinema to direct a fictional film. Her film SOS addresses the impact of modern and security in Mauritania.

Directors by country

 Algeria: Merzak Allouache
 Angola: Zézé Gamboa, Miguel Hurst
 Benin: Jean Odoutan, Idrissou Mora Kpaï
 Botswana: Thato Rantao Mwosa, Thabiso Maretlwaneng
 Burkina Faso: Idrissa Ouedraogo, Gaston Kaboré, Valérie Kaboré, Dani Kouyaté, Fanta Régina Nacro, Pierre Yameogo, Sanou Kollo, Pierre Rouamba, Drissa Touré, S. Pierre Yameogo, 
 Burundi: Léonce Ngabo, Justine Bitagoye, Eddy Munyaneza
 Cameroon: Jean-Pierre Bekolo, Dia Moukouri, Bassek Ba Kobhio, Jean-Pierre Dikongué Pipa, Francois L. Woukoache, Francis Taptue, Jean-Marie Teno, Thérèse Sita-Bella, Jean-Paul Ngassa, Joséphine Ndagnou
 Cape Verde: Leão Lopes, Júlio Silvão Tavares, Lolo Arziki
 Chad: Issa Serge Coelo, Mahamat Saleh Haroun
 Côte d'Ivoire: Desiré Ecaré, Fadika Kramo Lanciné, Roger Gnoan M'Bala, Jacques Trabi, Sidiki Bakaba, Henri Duparc, Akissi Delta, Marie-Louise Asseu
 Democratic Republic of the Congo: Machérie Ekwa Bahango, Balufu Bakupa-Kanyinda, Baloji, Mars Kadiombo Yamba Bilonda, Guy Bomanyama-Zandu, Claude Haffner, Mamadi Indoka, Kiripi Katembo, Joseph Kumbela, Laura Kutika, Zeka Laplaine, Albert Mongita, Djo Tunda Wa Munga, Guy Kabeya Muya, Mwezé Ngangura, Ne Kunda Nlaba, Monique Mbeka Phoba, Roger Kwami Zinga
 Egypt: Salah Abu Seif, Youssef Chahine, Yousry Nasrallah, Ezz El-Dine Zulficar, Sherif Arafa, Khaled Youssef, Marwan Hamed, Mohamed Khan, Shady Abdel Salam, Khairy Beshara, Samir Seif, Nader Galal, Ali Abdel-Khalek, Ashraf Fahmy, Radwan El-Kashef, Hady El Bagoury, Ali Ragab, Hala Khaleel, Ehab Lamey, Adel Adeeb, Tarek Al Eryan, Atef El-Tayeb, Daoud Abdel Sayed, Ehab Mamdouh, Sandra Nashaat
 Ethiopia: Haile Gerima, Hermon Hailay, Yemane Demissie, Salem Mekuria
 Gabon: Imunga Ivanga, Pierre-Marie Dong, Henri Joseph Koumba Bibidi, Charles Mensah
 Ghana: Kwaw Ansah, John Akomfrah, King Ampaw, Yaba Badoe, Akosua Busia, Kuukua Eshun, Chris Hesse, Jim Awindor, Tom Ribeiro, Ernest Abeikwe, Ajesu, Leila Djansi, Shirley Frimpong-Manso, Halaru B. Wandagou, Nii Kwate Owoo, Kwesi Owusu
 Guinea: Mohamed Camara, David Achkar, Cheik Doukouré, Cheick Fantamady Camara, Mama Keïta
 Guinea-Bissau: Flora Gomes, Sana Na N'Hada
 Kenya: Robby Bresson, Wanuri Kahiu, Judy Kibinge, Jane Munene, Anne Mungai, Wanjiru Kinyanjui, Jim Chuchu, Gilbert Lukalia
 Lesotho: Lemohang Jeremiah Mosese
 Mali: Souleymane Cissé, Cheick Oumar Sissoko, Abdoulaye Ascofare, Adama Drabo, Manthia Diawara
 Mauritania: Med Hondo, Abderrahmane Sissako, Azza Cheikh Malainine, Sidney Sokhona
 Namibia: Tim Huebschle, Richard Pakleppa, Joel Haikali
 Niger: Oumarou Ganda, Moustapha Alassane
 Nigeria: Femi Adebayo,  Ola Balogun, Biyi Bandele, Tade Ogidan, Kunle Afolayan, Izu Ojukwu,  Eddie Ugboma, Amaka Igwe, Zeb Ejiro, Lola Fani-Kayode, Bayo Awala, Greg Fiberesima, Jide Bello, Billy Kings, Tunde Kelani, Dele Ajakaiye, Chico Ejiro, Andy Amenechi, Obi Emelonye, Chris Obi Rapu, Iyabo Ojo, Yemi Shodimu, Zina Saro-Wiwa

 Rwanda: Eric Kabera, Kivu Ruhorahoza
 São Tomé and Príncipe: Ângelo Torres, Januário Afonso
 Senegal: Ousmane Sembène, Djibril Diop Mambéty, Safi Faye, Ben Diogaye Bèye, Mansour Sora Wade, Moussa Sène Absa, Tidiane Aw, Moussa Bathily, Clarence Thomas Delgado, Ahmadou Diallo, Dyana Gaye, Ousmane William Mbaye, Samba Félix Ndiaye, As Thiam, Momar Thiam, Moussa Touré, Mahama Johnson Traoré, Paulin Soumanou Vieyra, Mansour Sora Wade, Ibrahima Sarr, Alain Gomis
 Somalia: Abdisalam Aato, Abdulkadir Ahmed Said, Idil Ibrahim
 Sudan: Gadalla Gubara, Hussein Shariffe, Hajooj Kuka, Amjad Abu Alala, Suhaib Gasmelbari, Marwa Zein
 South Africa: Lionel Ngakane, Gavin Hood, Zola Maseko, Katinka Heyns, Neill Blomkamp, Seipati Bulani-Hopa, Mickey Dube, Nosipho Dumisa, Oliver Hermanus, Jonathan Liebesman, William Kentridge, Teddy Matthera, Morabane Modise, Sechaba Morejele, Nana Mahomo
 Togo: Anne Laure Folly
 Uganda: Usama Mukwaya, Kinene Yusuf, Kabali Jagenda, Mariam Ndagire, George Stanley Nsamba, Joseph Kenneth Ssebaggala, Hassan Kamoga, Matt Bish, Carol Kamya, Jacqueline Rose Kawere Nabagereka
 Zimbabwe: M. K. Asante, Jr., Tsitsi Dangarembga, Roger Hawkins,  Siphiwe Gloria Ndlovu, Jordan Riber

Films about African cinema
 Caméra d'Afrique, Director: Férid Boughedir, Tunisia/France, 1983
 Les Fespakistes, Directors: François Kotlarski, Eric Münch, Burkina Faso/France, 2001
 This Is Nollywood, Director: Franco Sacchi, 2007
 Sembene!, Director: Samba Gadjigo and Jason Silverman, 2015
 Le Congo, quel cinéma! - Director: Guy Bomanyama-Zandu, Democratic Republic of Congo
 La Belle at the Movies - Director: Cecilia Zoppelletto, Kinshasa
 Spell Reel - Filipa César, Guinea-Bissau

Film festivals 
Panafrican Film and Television Festival of Ouagadougou is the largest and most prestigious film festival in Africa
Cairo International Film Festival
Africa in Motion, held in Edinburgh, Scotland in late October
El Gouna Film Festival (GFF) held in El Gouna, Egypt
Sahara International Film Festival (FiSahara), held in Sahrawi refugee camps in Algeria
African Film Festival, held in New York
The African Film Festival (TAFF) held in Dallas in late June
Luxor African Film Festival
Silicon Valley African Film Festival, held in San Jose, California
Pan African Film Festival, held in Los Angeles
Alexandria International Film Festival
Africa World Documentary Film Festival, held in St Louis
Rwanda Film Festival (Hillywood), held in Rwanda
Bushman Film Festival, held in Abidjan, Côte d'Ivoire

See also

Sources

References

Bibliography

 Tomaselli, Keyan G., & Mhando, Martin (eds), Journal of African Cinemas, Bristol : Intellect, 2009 - , 
 Mahir Şaul and Ralph Austen (eds), Viewing African Cinema in the Twenty-First Century: Art Films and the Nollywood Video Revolution, Ohio University Press, 2010, 
 Roy Armes: Dictionary of African Filmmakers, Indiana University Press, 2008, 
 
 

 Fernando E. Solanas, Octavio Getino, "Towards a Third Cinema" in: Bill Nichols (ed.), Movies and Methods. An Anthology, University of California Press, 1976, pp. 44–64

 Africultures: see www.africultures.com (French and English)
 Afrimages: see www.afrimages.net (French and English)
 Africine: see www.africine.org (French and English)(African Federation of Film Critics)
 Samuel Lelievre (ed.), "Cinémas africains, une oasis dans le désert?", CinémAction, no. 106, Paris, Télérama/Corlet, 1st trimester 2003
 Écrans d'Afriques (1992–1998) French and English to read on www.africine.org or www.africultures.com

External links
Movie theatres re-opening in Africa (in French, extensive business discussion)
Congo in Harlem
The Heavy Flag of Pan-African Cinema
African Cinema in the 1990s
African Media Program comprehensive database of African media
Library of African Cinema in California
Wiki of the African Film Festival of Tarifa
http://www.utne.com/african-cinema-shift-cultural-perceptions.aspx 
Pan-African Film Festival, Cannes
"Top African Film Directors in Alphabetical order", Africapedia

African cinema
Africa
Library of Congress Africa Collection related
Film industry
Arts in Africa